Ethlyn T. Clough (August 21, 1858 – 1936) was an American newspaper publisher and editor. At the end of the 19th-century, five women in Michigan owned, edited, and personally managed their own newspapers, one of whom was Clough.  For eighteen years, she published The Brooklyn Exponent. She was the recording secretary of the Michigan Woman's Press Association (MWPA).

Early life
Ethlyn Theresa Packard was born in Monroeville, Ohio, August 21, 1858. She was a daughter of Daniel and Cornelia (Hubbell) Packard. Her parents were natives of Ohio.

Career
On July 21, 1876, she married Charles W. Clough, newspaper publisher, removing to Attica, Ohio. In 1878, they removed to Clinton, Ohio where the husband founded the Local. In 1881, her husband founded The Brooklyn Exponent. There being no other paper in Brooklyn, Michigan, and Mr. Clough being a practical printer, the location was most favorable for the establishment of a good weekly newspaper, and the Exponent soon commanded patronage and support. But, never robust, the hard labor soon began to tell upon him. At her husband's death, September 30, 1884, Mrs. Clough assumed the management of the paper, having learned how to manage a newspaper accidentally during her husband's lifetime.

Mrs. Clough, now a widow with four young children, was conscious of her abilities, and recognizing the necessity of having someone at the head of the business who would have a financial interest in its success, she at once assumed the responsibility of editor and publisher, and conducted the business, supporting herself and family of three children, one daughter, Adelaide M., having been adopted by her husband's sister at the time of his death.

Affiliations
She was a charter member of the MWPA, and in 1890, was elected a member of the committee on constitution and by-laws, and in 1893, became the recording secretary. She also served as president of Brooklyn's Saturday Night circle, a member of the Bay View Reading Club, which focused on literary study.

Personal life
Clough's sons and daughters were named respectively: Charles R., Adelaide M., Edward F. and Eleanor Maude.

She died in 1936 and was buried at Oxford Cemetery, in Oxford, Ohio. The Clough Memorial room of the Brooklyn (Michigan) Public Library was established in 1951 in her honor.

Selected works
 Norwegian life. : an account of past and contemporary conditions and progress in Norway and Sweden. Ed. and arranged., 1909
 Oriental life : an account of past and contemporary conditions and progress in Asia, excepting, China, India and Japan, 1910
 Africa : an account of past and contemporary conditions and progress, 1911
 South American life : an account of past and contemporary conditions and progress in south america.ed.and arranged by Ethlyn T. Clough. , 1912
 German life; an account of the past and contemporary conditions and progress in Germany., 1913

References

Attribution

Bibliography

External links
 

1858 births
1936 deaths
19th-century American newspaper publishers (people)
19th-century American newspaper editors
20th-century American non-fiction writers
20th-century American women writers
19th-century American women writers
American women non-fiction writers
People from Monroeville, Ohio
Journalists from Ohio
Women newspaper editors